Louis-Andre Schaffner (4 April 1906 – 21 November 1980) was a French racing cyclist. He rode in the 1927 Tour de France.

References

1906 births
1980 deaths
French male cyclists
Place of birth missing